A list of films produced by the Israeli film industry in 1994.

1994 releases

Unknown premiere date

Awards

Ophir Award
Sh'Chur by Shmuel Hasfari

Wolgin Award
Best Israeli Feature: Ha-Merhak (lit. "The distance") by Dan Wolman
Best Israeli Documentary: Istiklal by Nizar Hassan
Best Short Film: Home by David Ofek

See also
1994 in Israel

References

External links
 Israeli films of 1994 at the Internet Movie Database

Israeli
Film
1994